Afobaka is a village in the Brokopondo District of Suriname. Between 1960 and 1964, the 1913 meter-long Afobaka Dam was built on the Suriname River, creating the Brokopondo Reservoir. The Afobaka Airstrip is nearby.

Healthcare 
Afobaka is home to a Medische Zending healthcare centre.

References

External links

Populated places in Brokopondo District